Arthur Espenet Carpenter (January 20, 1920 – May 25, 2006) was a master woodworker and furniture maker in Bolinas, California  known for his wishbone chair and desk with scalloped seashell sides. Self-taught, he joined the Baulines Craft Guild. He also taught had apprentices. His work is in the collection of the Smithsonian Institution and has been exhibited in The Museum of Modern Art and The Museum of Arts and Design in New York. He was declared a “living California treasure” in 1984. He received The Furniture Society's Award of Distinction in 2001.

References

1920 births
2006 deaths
American woodworkers
People from Bolinas, California